Cherny Iyus   is a mountain river in the northern part of Khakassia, Russia. It flows through the territories of the Shirinsky and Ordzhonikidze districts. Merging with the Bely Iyus it forms the Chulym River, the right tributary of the Ob.

Etymology 
Also known as Hara-Üüs, Chërnyy Iyus, Chyorny Iyus, Chyorny Yus, Czernoi Ijus, Tchernoi Yious   Russian name  comes from local name .  Occurs in the pre-reform spelling  , and in the Khakass spelling  . 

Khakass  "хара" from proto Turkic "kara"  meaning "black".  In Eurasiatic "*ḳara" meaning "flood, spring" come from Proto-Altaic "*k`ăra" meaning "tide, ebb-tide, flood"  come from Proto-Turkic "*KAr-" meaning "to overflow".

Khakas "üüs"  from Common Turkic "*ügüz"  meaning “small river” comes from Proto-Turkic "*ügüŕ (~ *ö-)" of Altaic etymology meaning "small river"  "ügüz" (Old Turkic/Orkhon/Old Uyghur, Ouyghur/Karakhanid/Sary-Yughur), "ochus" (Middle Turkic/Kypc)  "ögüz" (Uighur),  "ǖs" (Khakas) and  related to Proto-Mongolic "*üyer" meaning flood, freshet.

An analysis of the toponymy of the Khakass-Minusinsk basin and the areas adjacent to it indicates that, along with the stratified Turkic toponyms of a later origin, toponyms clarified from the Ugric and Samoyedic languages dominated here.

The inhabitants of the Urals call the rivers flowing to the West White rivers; those that flow to the East or to Siberia, in Black rivers.

Description 
Cherny Iyus belongs to the middle size rivers of Khakassia.

Source of Cherny Iyus are the tarn lakes (Chernoye (Black)  :, Vysokoye (High) , Dolgoye (Long) , Verkhneye (Upper) , Lake #80747788  Lake #583652017  )   and Glaciers #80747767, #80747752,  #80747704  on the eastern slope of Mount Bely Golets  in Kuznetsk Alatau.

Mouth of Cherny Iyus is river Chulym where Cherny Iyus and Bely Iyus join together.

The swampiness of the river basin is about 5%, the forest cover is 75%. In the annual course of the water regime, spring floods are distinguished (starting from the second or third decade of April, lasting up to a month), summer-autumn (lasting 2–4 months) and winter (from late October to early November) base flow. Summer-autumn base flow is repeatedly interrupted by rain pickups. The total spring-summer runoff is 80–85%. In winter, icing is observed with the release of water onto the ice. The average annual water consumption is  according to Stream gauging station in Sarala about 55 км from Source of the Cherny Iyus river.  The waters of the rivers of mountainous regions, in the nutrition of which high-mountain snows and glaciers  play a significant role, are characterized by a bicarbonate-calcium composition and very low (less than 0.1 g/dm³) mineralization.

Upstream (before the confluence of the Bolshoi Injul river) the river has a sublatitudinal direction of the valley with a typical mountainous nature of the watercourse. The speed of the river flow is  -  m / s, channel width  - , depth  - . In this part of the basin, the river has many tributaries, the main of which are: on the left - the rivers Podsnezhnaya, Demidovka, Izbass with Uspenka. Nameless and Bobrova, Berezovaya, Injul; on the right - the rivers Poltavka, Sargaya, Krutoy, Karagainsky Injul, Small Black Iyus, Big Injul.

After the confluence of the rivers Big and Small Inzhul, Kolchakovsky stream, the general direction the river flow changes sharply to submeridional, the width of the valley increases to - (near the village of Chebaki and the village of Gaidarovsk). Further, before the confluence of the Sarala River, the valley narrows to  - , but her character remains the same. On this section of the valley, they flow into the Black Iyus River: on the left - small rivers and streams Systygchul, Stuchul, Blinzhul, Kerebezhik, Tranzhul, Sektinsky, Pelageikin, Chesnokov; on the right - Belaya Pilnya, Martachul, Izekiyula. After the confluence of the river Sarala Black Iyus again changes its direction to sublatitudinal, the width of the valley increases to  - , it also has many ducts, branches, small lakes and oxbow lakes, the longitudinal slope decreases to 0.0015. The river has only one tributary here on the left - the river Pechische 

In its upper reaches, the river flows in limestones, but in general its left-bank mountains consist of granites and syenites, and the right-bank ones consist of clay shales, limestones and sandstones. Many gold-bearing rivers flow into the river.

Kyzyl people live in the valley of the Black Ius River.

Tributaries 
(km from mouth)

 : Pechesche (Kostinsky Pechische) (left) 
 Ustinkin  (left) 
 : Pravaya Sarala (Sarala) (left)
 : unnamed watercourse 
 Kokchen (left) 
 Chesnokov (left)
 Pelageiken (left) 
 : Tranjul
 :  Cheryomushka (Sastygchul, Sistychul) (left)
 : Small Inzhul (Rozhdestvenskiy)
 Bolshoi Injul (Big Injul)
 : Maly Cherny Iyus (Small Black Iyus)
 : Inzhul (left)
 : Izbass (left)
 : unnamed watercourse 
 Nizhnyaya Demidovka (left)
 Demidovka (left) 
 Poltavka (right)

Water registry data 
According to the State Water Register of Russia, it belongs to the Upper Ob Basin District, the water management section of the Chulym river from the city of Achinsk to the water metering station in the village of Zyryanskoye, the river sub-basin of the Chulym river. The river basin of the river is the (Upper) Ob to the confluence of the Irtysh.

History 
The earliest scientific  and cartographically accurate description of  Cherny Iyus river  region  was done by German doctor and naturalist Daniel Gottlieb Messerschmidt in the expedition on the territory of the Yenisei  Siberia 1720–1727 who was personally accepted into the Russian service by Peter the Great.

In  it was described by German historian and geographer Müller Gerhard Friedrich in his notes during Great Northern Expedition1733 -1743, at that time upper part of Chulym also was called Iyus.

In 1812 it become famous for the richest placers of gold and its development of gold mining. Gold placers began to be developed 1832,   507 poods of gold was mined in the Cherny Iyus river basin from 1834 and by 1900.

In 1835 it was also mentioned in "Description of the Yeniseisk Governorate" by the first governor of  Yeniseysk Governorate in Krasnoyarsk Alexander Petrovich Stepanov in his work awarded the half Demidov Prize by the scientific community in the "Statistics" section and Nicholas I awarded Stepanov a diamond ring for this book.

In 1881 it was described by Pestov and noted that Chulym Tatar population was living around area between Cherny Iyus and Bely Iyus.  

In 1890  was described by Nikolaii Vasilʹevich Latkin  in the Brockhaus and Efron Encyclopaedic Dictionary  and beside gold mining  also mentioning copper mine and a factory in the tributary of the Cherny Iyus, the Pechishche River. The river basin region was known  for  monuments of ferrous metallurgy.

Fauna 
Moschus moschiferus listed in Red Data Book of Khakassia

See also 

 List of rivers of Russia
 Chebaki (Khakassia)

References 

 Water resources of the Shirinsky district of the Republic of Khakassia / Ed. Parnacheva V.P. Tomsk: Publishing House of Tomsk University, 1999;
 Upper Ob Basin Water Authority

Tributaries of the Ob
Rivers of Khakassia